Jogindernagar Assembly constituency is one of the 68 constituencies in the Himachal Pradesh Legislative Assembly of Himachal Pradesh a northern state of India. Jogindernagar is also part of Mandi Lok Sabha constituency.

Members of Legislative Assembly

Election candidates

2022

Election results

2017

See also
 Jogindernagar
 List of constituencies of Himachal Pradesh Legislative Assembly

References

External links
 

Assembly constituencies of Himachal Pradesh
Mandi district